Tebicuary-mí is a district in the Paraguarí department of Paraguay.

Sources 
World Gazeteer: Paraguay – World-Gazetteer.com

Populated places in the Paraguarí Department